Jafar Salmani (born 12 January 1997) is an Iranian professional footballer who plays as a left winger for Persian Gulf Pro League club Esteghlal.

Club career

Sanat Naft
He made his debut for Sanat Naft Abadan in 25th fixtures of 2017–18 Iran Pro League against Siah Jamegan.

Portimonense
On 20 December 2020, Salmani signed a 2.5-year contract with Portuguese club Portimonense, where he was reunited with Paulo Sérgio, his former coach at Sanat Naft.

Esteghlal

International career

He made his debut on March 30, 2021 against Syria.

Career statistics

Club

International
Statistics accurate as of match played 2 September 2021.

Honours

Esteghlal 

Iran Pro League: 2021–22
 Iranian Super Cup:  2022

References

1997 births
Living people
People from Shadegan
Association football wingers
Iranian footballers
Iran youth international footballers
Iran international footballers
Sanat Naft Abadan F.C. players
Portimonense S.C. players
Esteghlal F.C. players
Persian Gulf Pro League players
Primeira Liga players
Iranian expatriate footballers
Expatriate footballers in Portugal
Iranian expatriate sportspeople in Portugal
Sportspeople from Khuzestan province